This page is a complete chronological listing of AFL Women's minor premiers. The AFL Women's (AFLW) is the elite national competition in women's Australian rules football.

The team that finishes the home-and-away season on top of the premiership ladder is known as the "minor premier". In the inaugural two AFL Women's seasons, the minor premier hosted the AFL Women's Grand Final, as there was no finals series. This was unlike the Australian Football League (AFL), where the AFL Grand Final is the culmination of a finals series, and finishing on top of the ladder provides only minor benefits. No award has yet been given to the AFL Women's minor premier, and the main league award is the AFL Women's premiership, which is awarded to the winner of the AFL Women's Grand Final.

There were no officially recognised minor premiers in 2019 and 2020 due to the use of a conference system in those seasons. The league reverted to a single ladder in 2021, thus making the recognition of minor premiers an obvious process.

List of minor premiers
The following is a list of minor premiers, ladder details and results.

Minor premiership wins

See also

 List of AFL Women's premiers
 List of VFL/AFL minor premiers

Notes

References

External links
 Official AFL Women's website

Minor premiers
Premiers, Women